Königsberger STV was a German association football club from the city of Königsberg, East Prussia.

History
Königsberger Sport- und Turnverein was established in 1922. In 1935, the club played in the Bezirk Königsberg, a city-based circuit that was part of the Gauliga Ostpreußen, a top-flight regional division in Germany. They played three seasons there before being demoted and returned for the last two seasons played (1942–44) before the area was overtaken by fighting in the late stages of World War II. STV took part in the opening rounds of the Tschammerspokal, predecessor to today's DFB-Pokal (German Cup) in 1941. They put out Prussia-Samland Königsberg 8:3 before being eliminated themselves at the hands of VfB Königsberg 0:8. The club played at Walter-Simon Platz in Mittelhufen.

The Königsberg club disappeared in 1945 following the end of the war when the city was annexed by the Soviet Union and renamed Kaliningrad.

References

 Der Fußball in Ostpreußen und Danzig (en: Football in East Prussia and Danzig)
Das deutsche Fußball-Archiv historical German domestic league tables

Football clubs in Germany
Defunct football clubs in Germany
Association football clubs established in 1922
Association football clubs disestablished in 1945
Defunct football clubs in former German territories
Sport in Königsberg